Maxine Trottier (born May 3, 1950) is an American-born Canadian educator and writer.  She currently lives in Newfoundland.

She was born in Grosse Pointe Farms, Michigan and moved with her family to Windsor, Ontario when she was 10.  She became a Canadian citizen in 1970.   She graduated from the University of Western Ontario with a degree in education. Trottier taught elementary school for 31 years.

She writes books for young people. The Tiny Kite of Eddie Wing won the Canadian Library Association Book of the Year for Children Award.

She is known for writing about the history of Canada. She draws on her own mixed racial heritage as a descendant of Métis ancestors.  Many of her books feature bilingual English/Mi'kmaq texts.

Selected works 
 Laura: A Childhood Tale of Laura Secord
 Circle of Silver Chronicles
 Alone in an Untamed Land
 Blood Upon Our Land
 Storm the Fortress: The Siege of Quebec, William Jenkins, New France, 1759
 Terry Fox: A Story of Hope 2005

Awards 
 Canadian Children's Book Centre (CCBC) Our Choice Awards selection, 1993–94, for Alison's House
 CCBC Our Choice Awards selection, 1995-96 for The Voyage of Wood Duck
 FWTAO Writers' Award, 1996, for The Voyage of Wood Duck
 FWTAO Writers' Award, 1995 for The Tiny Kite of Eddie Wing
 Canadian Library Association Book of the Year for Children, 1996, for The Tiny Kite of Eddie Wing
 Chicago Women in Publishing first-place designation, 1997, for A Safe Place
 Marianna Dempster Memorial Award, 1998 for Heartsong
 CCBC Centre Our Choice Awards selection, 1997–98, for Heartsong
 Mr. Christie's Award, 2000, for Claire's Gift
 Society of School Librarians International Honor Book Award for Language Arts, 2005, for Sister to the Wolf

References 

1950 births
Living people
Canadian children's writers
Writers from Newfoundland and Labrador